Tuomo Turunen (born 30 August 1987) is a Finnish footballer. He currently represents Kotkan Työväen Palloilijat, playing in Ykkönen the Finnish second division. He plays as a defender or midfielder. Before moving to Trelleborg, he played for FC Honka, FC KooTeePee and IFK Göteborg. He is also a member of Finland national under-21 football team. In 2008, he was selected as the best under-21 player in Finland.

In December 2008, Honka and Helsingborg IF were negotiating about selling Turunen to the Swedish club, but Turunen stayed in Espoo. In July 2009, he was sold to IFK Göteborg and signed for 3.5 years.

Personal life
Teemu Turunen is his elder brother.

References

1987 births
Living people
Finnish footballers
Finnish expatriate footballers
Finland international footballers
Finland under-21 international footballers
FC Honka players
IFK Göteborg players
FC Inter Turku players
Allsvenskan players
Veikkausliiga players
Finnish expatriate sportspeople in Sweden
Expatriate footballers in Sweden
Kotkan Työväen Palloilijat players
Association football defenders
Trelleborgs FF players
People from Kuopio
Sportspeople from North Savo